Open Window (2004) is an album by the American ambient musician Robert Rich. This is an album of improvised piano solos. Rich's piano solos have been a part of his live concerts for over 20 years but this is the first time that a recording has been released in a recorded form.

The material on this album was performed on a 1925 vintage A.B. Chase baby grand piano. During the two months in which this album was recorded, microphones were set up permanently around the piano waiting for moments of spontaneous creativity. All of the recordings on this album were made during these moments. The pace of this album is dynamic, ranging from gentle textures to sudden bursts of activity.

Track listing
”Parting Clouds” – 5:10
”Corners” – 4:16
”Insular” – 10:13
”Past Glances” – 9:26
”Open Window” – 8:00
”Parallel Horizons” – 10:50
”Points Between” – 14:29
”Punctuation” – 1:54

External links
Album feature from Robert Rich’s official web site

Robert Rich (musician) albums
2004 albums